Plague Park is Handsome Furs' first full-length album. Handsome Furs is Dan Boeckner (Wolf Parade, Atlas Strategic) and his wife, Alexei Perry.

The record is named after the park Ruttopuisto, situated in Helsinki, Finland. Commonly referred to as "Plague Park", the park grounds sit atop a mass grave that contains the victims of the 1710 plague.

The recordings combine plaintive, angst-filled singing with loud, electronic accompaniment and heavy percussion.

Track listing

Reception

Plague Park has received generally positive reviews. On the review aggregate site Metacritic, the album has a score of 72 out of 100, indicating "generally favorable reviews."

Personnel
The following people contributed to Plague Park:

Handsome Furs
 Dan Boeckner 
 Alexei Perry

Additional personnel
 Handsome Furs - Audio Engineer, Audio Production
 H.F. - Engineer
 Chad Jones - Audio Engineer, Audio Production, Help
 Harris Newman - Mastering
 Arlen Thompson - Audio Engineer, Audio Production, Engineer, Mixing, Producer

Notes
Track nine is listed on Sub Pop's website as "The Radio's Hot Sun", but in the physical liner of the album, is listed as "In The Radio's Hot Sun".

References

External links
Videos
 "Cannot Get Started"
 "Dumb Animals"

2007 debut albums
Handsome Furs albums
Sub Pop albums